The Miss Lebanon 2017 event  was held on September 24, 2017. That year, 16 candidates from different regions & cities of Lebanon competed for the national crown. 
Miss Lebanon Perla helou represented Lebanon at the Miss World 2017, meanwhile the Miss Universe Lebanon  and Miss International Lebanon will go to Miss Universe 2017 and Miss International 2017, respectively.

Placements

Special awards
 Miss Photogenic -  Perla Helou (Baabda)
 Miss Influential - Reem khoury (Miziara)

Officials Candidates

References

External links
Official Site

Miss Lebanon
2017 in Lebanon
Lebanon
September 2017 events in Lebanon